Kihelkonna Parish was a municipality in Saare County, Estonia.

The parish included the islands named Aherahu, Juksirahu, Kalarahu, Käkirahu, Laasirahu, Loonalaid, Maturahu, Mihklirahu, Noogimaa, Nootamaa, Ojurahu, Salava, Uus-Nootamaa, Vaika islands, Vesiloo, and Vilsandi, and the peninsula (formerly an island) of Harilaid.

The municipality has a population of 891 (as of 1 January 2006) and covers an area of 245.94 km2.

During the administrative-territorial reform in 2017, all 12 municipalities on the island Saaremaa were merged into a single municipality – Saaremaa Parish.

Settlements
Small borough
Kihelkonna
Villages
Abaja - Abula - Kallaste - Kalmu - Karujärve - Kehila - Kiirassaare - Kõõru - Kõruse - Kotsma - Kuralase - Kuremetsa - Kurevere - Kuumi - Kuusiku - Läägi - Lätiniidi - Liiva - Loona - Mäebe - Metsaküla - Neeme - Odalätsi - Oju - Pajumõisa - Pidula - Rannaküla - Rootsiküla - Sepise - Tagamõisa - Tammese - Tohku - Undva - Üru - Vaigu - Varkja - Vedruka - Veere - Viki - Vilsandi - Virita

See also 
 Municipalities of Estonia
 List of municipalities of Estonia

References

External links
Official home page only in Estonian language